On Approval may refer to:

 On Approval (play), a 1926 play by Frederick Lonsdale
 On Approval (1930 film), a 1930 British comedy film directed by and starring Tom Walls based on the play
 On Approval (1944 film), a 1944 British comedy film directed by Clive Brook based on the play
 On Approval (1964 film), a 1964 Australian TV play based on the play